The 1988 Detroit Lions season was the 59th season in franchise history. The team fell a step further from their 4–11 record in the strike-affected 1987 season, losing 12 of 16 games and suffering their fifth successive losing record. Head coach Darryl Rogers, who had served since 1985, was fired after 11 games and replaced by defensive coordinator Wayne Fontes.

The 1988 Lions’ offense was historically inept; their 3,405 offensive yards gained is the second-lowest all-time in a 16-game season, and the lowest total of the 1980s. Their 220 points scored (13.75 per game) is the fifth-fewest of the 1980s. They scored 20 or more points only three times all season.

Offseason

NFL Draft

Personnel

Staff

Roster

Regular season

Schedule

Game summaries

Week 1

Week 8

Week 12

Week 14

Standings

References

External links 
 1988 Detroit Lions at Pro-Football-Reference.com

Detroit Lions
Detroit Lions seasons
Detroit Lions